Corleto Monforte is a town and comune with 615 residents in the province of Salerno in the Campania region of south-western Italy.

History
Corleto Monforte gets its name from the Latin word coryletum, meaning "a thicket of hazeltrees" (Corylus avellana). "Monforte", from the Latin words mons fortis meaning "strong mountain", refers to the location's history as a fortification for feudal lords.

Francesco Torre, in his book Cenni storici di Corleto Monforte ("A Brief History of Corleto Monforte"), published in 1893, recounts some of the theories on the origin of the town's name: The first title given to Corleto, as is found in historical documents, was 'Cornito,' which became 'Corneto' over time by one of those simple changes which occur in the other names of towns and cities. There are various opinions regarding the origin of this name. Some believe that Cornito, or Corneto, derives from cor nitidum, [Latin, meaning splendid heart]; others from the fact that the estate was abundant in horned animals [from Italian cornuto, meaning horned]; and, finally, others maintain that the town was called Cornito on account of the cornus arbor, as there were forests of dogwood (Cornus mas) in the area. From these three versions, the third seems to us to be more plausible, because the ancient Lucani, as related by Varro, the Antonines, and other ancient historians, were accustomed to give towns their name based on the nature of the site where they settled; and Corleto in those times was abundant, as it is still now, in dogwood. The reason for which Corneto was changed to Corleto with the turn of the centuries, we do not know. Thanks only to the aid of philology and tradition are we able to posit that the Corletani, on account of a joyful heart, named their town cor laetum [Latin, joyful heart], and this too explains the fact that Corleto uses a heart on its crest.From 1811 to 1860 it was part of the region of Sant'Angelo a Fasanella, which belonged to the District of Campania during the Kingdom of the Two Sicilies.

From 1860 to 1927, during the Kingdom of Italy, Corleto Monforte was a part of the mandamento of Sant'Angelo a Fasanella, still nominally within the District of Campania.

To ensure that Corleto was distinct from other towns of the same name, the Corletani appended the phrase "at Fasanella", indicating "opposite old Fasanella", to the town's name. Following the ministerial agreement of June 30, 1862, the Town Council of Corleto replaced "at Fasanella" with the word "Monforte", effective after deliberation on November 18 of the same year.

Geography
Corleto is situated in the north-west of Cilento, in the vicinity of Cilento National Park in Valdiano at the foot of the Alburni Mountains.

It is located off a country road that connects it to Postiglione and continues to the Castelcivita Caves, to the south of Strada Statale 166. The old town, which constitutes almost all of the village, stands next to a ravine overlooking the Fasanella river valley.

The only hamlet is Carnale, which consists of a scattered group of houses and farmsteads and is situated along a trunk road.

Main sights
The  Old Town has been renovated and equipped with tourism routes and signs. The final portion is at the tip of the ravine, and consists of a square balcony that overlooks the valley of Fasanella. The balcony, facing west, is called Capo d'Armi ("Weapons' Bluff"), as it was the first stronghold from which enemies could be repelled. On Capo d'Armi stands the Church of St. Theodore, built in 1500, as is inscribed above what remains of the main door. Tradition, ignoring the inscription, maintains that idols were once worshiped in the temple. This leads to belief that the temple existed prior to the coming of Christ. Particularly compelling is the Piazza of Diana, so-called because it was near the temple of Diana, Goddess of the Hunt. After the coming of Christ, according to the tradition, it was made into a Christian place of worship by the name St. Maria dell'Elice. This new title was given to the temple of Diana during the act of its transformation because there was an ilex plant in front of it. The Church of St. Barbara was built in 1762 in substitution of the Church of St. Maria dell'Elice, as is apparent from the inscription on its facade. It is the largest church in the town. The church contains many excellent and antique paintings, magnificent sculptures (including a very impressive statue of St. Barbara, the patron saint of Corleto), and many altars (three of which are marble, including the largest). The church's belltower was erected upon the rocks that protrude from the right side of the Piazza Diana.
The Forest of Corleto is a large forested area situated on the southwestern portion of the Alburni. It borders the Passo della Sentinella, with San Rufo at its end. It mainly consists of beech trees and is naturally contiguous with Pruno, further to the south.
The Natural Museum of the Alburni Mountains, founded in 1997, is situated in the center of the town. It is a large organization dedicated to wildlife monitoring and biological research.

References

External links

Official website 

Cities and towns in Campania
Localities of Cilento